The Winnipeg Metropolitan Region (formerly called the Winnipeg Capital Region and the Manitoba Capital Region) is a metropolitan area in the Canadian province of Manitoba located in the Red River Valley in the southeast portion of the province of Manitoba, Canada. It contains the provincial capital of Winnipeg and 17 surrounding rural municipalities, cities, and towns.

Other places in the Region besides Winnipeg with a population over 1,000 are the city of Selkirk; towns of Stonewall and Niverville; and communities of Oakbank, Oak Bluff, Stony Mountain, Teulon, and Lorette. As the most densely-populated and economically-important area of Manitoba, the Region accounts for two-thirds of the province's population and 70% of the provincial GDP .

It also includes the smaller census metropolitan area (CMA) of Winnipeg, with the addition of the Brokenhead 4 Indian Reserve.

History 

In the late 1990s, issues such as providing Shoal Lake water to nearby municipalities and allowing exurban housing growth beyond Winnipeg became more important. At the time, Mayor Susan Thompson voiced the idea of a regional planning authority to mediate such issues.

In June 1998, former Great West Life President Kevin Kavanagh was appointed by Premier Gary Filmon to chair the Capital Region Review Committee. The panel looked at land-use planning and economic development between the City of Winnipeg and surrounding municipalities. Thompson along with the mayors and reeves of the 14 municipalities adjacent to Winnipeg began to meet on a regular basis starting in October 1998, thus forming the Winnipeg Metropolitan Region. Due to a change of government in September 1999, however, creating a regional planning authority took longer than originally foreseen.

The Capital Region was originally defined in 2006, through The Capital Region Partnership Act, to include 16 municipalities.

A pro-economic growth planning document was released in November 2018, called Securing Our Future: An Action Plan for Winnipeg's Metropolitan Region.

In October 2019, Dentons released a speech and discussion document, For the Benefit of All: Regional Competitiveness and Collaboration in the Winnipeg Metro Region, which sought to reform regional planning. Upon publication, Premier Brian Pallister and Winnipeg Mayor Brian Bowman spoke in favour of creating a new entity to manage development and transportation in the Winnipeg Metro Region.

Membership
The Winnipeg Metro Region is located in the Red River Valley in the southeast portion of the province of Manitoba, and is bounded to the north by the south basin of Lake Winnipeg.

The Region was originally defined in The Capital Region Partnership Act (2006) to include 16 municipalities. Since that time, the Town of Niverville and the Village of Dunnottar have been incorporated into the Winnipeg Metropolitan Region, giving the Region 18 municipalities in total.

The Region today comprises the following cities, towns, and RMs:

 City of Winnipeg
 City of Selkirk
 Town of Stonewall
 Town of Niverville
 Village of Dunnottar
 RM of Cartier
 RM of East St. Paul
 RM of Headingley
 RM of Macdonald

 RM of Ritchot
 RM of Rockwood
 RM of Rosser
 RM of Springfield
 RM of St. Andrews
 RM of St. Clements
 RM of St. François Xavier
 RM of Taché
 RM of West St. Paul

However, there are some municipalities that are geographically (entirely or largely) within the Region's territory that are not officially part of the Metro Region. These include the town of Teulon, the village of Garson, and the Indian reserve of Brokenhead Ojibway Nation.

Winnipeg census metropolitan area 
The Winnipeg Metro Region includes the smaller Winnipeg census metropolitan area (CMA), with the addition of the Brokenhead 4 Indian Reserve. The included CMA municipalities are:

 Winnipeg
 East St. Paul
 Headingley
 Ritchot
 Rosser

 Springfield
 St. Clements
 St. François Xavier
 Taché
 West St. Paul

Demographics

Population 
The population of the Winnipeg Metro Region is greatly concentrated within the city of Winnipeg itself, which has 86.5% of the Region's population residing in less than 6% of its land area. On the provincial level, the city has 54.9% of the province's population, while the Region's share is 63.5%.

Ethnicity 

Note: Totals greater than 100% due to multiple origin responses.

Language 
The question on knowledge of languages allows for multiple responses. The following figures are from the 2021 Canadian Census, and lists languages that were selected by at least 1,000 respondents.

Governance 
Regional partnership is led by a board of governors. , board members include:

 Scott Gillingham, City of Winnipeg councillor — board co-chair
 Shelley Hart, RM of East St. Paul mayor — board co-chair
 John Orlikow, City of Winnipeg councillor
 Larry Johannson, City of Selkirk mayor
 Christa Vann Mitchell, RM of Cartier reeve
 Jim Robson, RM of Headingley councillor
 Brad Erb, RM of Macdonald reeve
 Chris Ewen, RM of Ritchot mayor
 J. Wesley Taplin, RM of Rockwood reeve
 Fran Smee, RM of Rosser reeve
 Tiffany Fell, RM of Springfield mayor
 Joy Sul, RM of St. Andrews mayor
 Debbie Fiebelkorn, RM of St. Clements mayor
 Rick van Wyk, RM of St. François Xavier reeve
 Justin Denis Bohemier, RM of Taché mayor
 Cheryl Christian, RM of West St. Paul mayor
 Myron Dyck, Town of Niverville mayor
 Clive Hinds, Town of Stonewall mayor
 Rick Gamble, Village of Dunnottar mayor

In addition to those located entirely in the City of Winnipeg, the Region falls into several federal electoral districts:

 Charleswood—St. James—Assiniboia—Headingley
 Kildonan—St. Paul
 Portage—Lisgar (northeastern portion)
 Provencher (northwestern portion)
 Selkirk—Interlake—Eastman (southern portion)

See also 

 List of Manitoba regions
 List of communities in Manitoba
 Southern Manitoba
Metropolitan Corporation of Greater Winnipeg
Winnipeg Regional Health Authority
Metro Winnipeg Transit
Metro Winnipeg (newspaper)
Amalgamation of Winnipeg
Regional planning

Notes

References

External links 
 Government of Manitoba Community profiles:
 Regional Map
 Census Divisions Map
 Municipality Profiles
 Winnipeg Capital Region Map

 
Geography of Winnipeg
Geographic regions of Manitoba
Winnipeg